This is a list of dyes with Colour Index International generic names and numbers and CAS Registry numbers.

Note
 Synonyms should be treated with caution because they are often used inconsistently, see discussion page and external link

See also
 Glossary of dyeing terms

Sources
 BDH laboratory chemicals & biochemicals catalogue 1983
 Important Early Synthetic Dyes 1991 Smithsonian Institute

External links
 Stainsfile dye index
 World Dye Variety
 Hazardous substances used in textile dyeing

Dyes
Dyes